Sergei Pavlovich Orlov (born 17 March 1974, in Volgograd) is a Russian football coach and a former player.

References

1974 births
Sportspeople from Volgograd
Living people
Soviet footballers
Russian footballers
FC Tekstilshchik Kamyshin players
Russian Premier League players
FC Mordovia Saransk players
Russian football managers
Association football defenders
FC Nosta Novotroitsk players